"Enemy" is the lead single from American rock band Fozzy's All That Remains album.

Lyrics 
The song is about former friends, who now have become enemies and one's struggle to deal with his problems.

Music video 
A music video was produced for the song and was filmed on the top of a government building in San Diego. The clip was controversial in that it featured a disabled individual entering a building, where the elevators were out of service, proceeding to climb out of his wheelchair and crawl up the stairs of the large building, only to reach the top, crawl to the edge of the roof of the building and push himself off, committing suicide. It aired on Headbangers Ball and was banned after one showing.

Release and reception 
"Enemy" was released as the lead single to the band's third record. The song become a minor hit for Fozzy as it received airplay in over 80 stations across the US. The song is one of Fozzy's most well-known songs and has become a staple at live shows.

In popular culture 
"Enemy" was featured as the theme song for World Wrestling Entertainment (WWE's) No Way Out pay-per-view in 2005 and Total Nonstop Action Wrestling (TNA's) Bound for Glory pay-per-view in 2006.

Tracks 
Enemy
Lazarus
Enemy (instrumental)
Interview with Chris Jericho and Rich Ward

Personnel 
Chris Jericho – lead vocals
Rich Ward – guitar, backing vocals
Frank Fontsere – drums
Sean Delson – bass
Mike Martin – rhythm guitar
Jon Beato – guitar solo

2006 singles
Fozzy songs
2004 songs